Curtis Allen Young (born April 16, 1960) is a former professional baseball pitcher and pitching coach. He played all or parts of 11 seasons in Major League Baseball, and previously served as pitching coach for the Oakland Athletics and the San Francisco Giants.

Playing career
Young was drafted by the Athletics in the fourth round of the 1981 draft. He joined the big league club in 1983 and played with the A's through the 1991 season, starting opening night for them in 1987. In 1992 he played for both the Kansas City Royals and New York Yankees before rejoining Oakland in 1993.

Coaching career
Prior to his appointment as A's pitching coach in 2004, Young spent four seasons in the same capacity within the Oakland minor-league system.  Young left the A's after the 2010 season, following an offer of a one-year contract.

On November 2, 2010, the Boston Red Sox announced he was hired to fill the team's vacant pitching coach position. In October 2011, following the Red Sox' September collapse, The Red Sox granted permission for Young and the other coaches to seek other opportunities. On October 21, Young was re-hired by the Oakland Athletics as their pitching coach after only one year in Boston. Young was relieved of his duties with the Athletics on June 15, 2017.

References

External links

Major League Baseball pitchers
Oakland Athletics players
Kansas City Royals players
New York Yankees players
Boston Red Sox coaches
Oakland Athletics coaches
Major League Baseball pitching coaches
Medford A's players
Modesto A's players
Tacoma Tigers players
Omaha Royals players
Columbus Clippers players
Central Michigan Chippewas baseball players
Baseball players from Michigan
Sportspeople from Saginaw, Michigan
1960 births
Living people
Anchorage Glacier Pilots players